Paulino Martínez (born 31 August 1952) is a former Spanish racing cyclist. He rode in four Grand Tours between 1978 and 1981. He also competed in the road race event at the 1976 Summer Olympics.

References

External links
 

1952 births
Living people
Spanish male cyclists
Sportspeople from Burgos
Cyclists at the 1976 Summer Olympics
Olympic cyclists of Spain
Cyclists from Castile and León